Luca Emanuel Meisl (born 4 March 1999) is an Austrian professional footballer who plays as a centre-back for Belgian club Beerschot.

Career

Club career
Meisl came up in the Red Bull Salzburg academy. He then played for Liefering. He scored a goal in 11 matches played during the 2016–17 season and no goals in 24 matches played in the 2017–18 season. He also made a league appearance and a cup appearance during the 2017–18 season for Red Bull Salzburg.

During the 2018–19 season he will play on loan for SKN St. Pölten.

On 1 September 2020 he signed with SV Ried.

International career
Meisl has played for Austria's U-16, U-17, U-18, and U-19 teams.

Career statistics

References

External links

 

1999 births
Footballers from Salzburg
Living people
Austrian footballers
Austria youth international footballers
Austria under-21 international footballers
Association football defenders
FC Liefering players
FC Red Bull Salzburg players
SKN St. Pölten players
SV Ried players
K Beerschot VA players
Austrian Football Bundesliga players
2. Liga (Austria) players
Challenger Pro League players
Austrian expatriate footballers
Expatriate footballers in Belgium
Austrian expatriate sportspeople in Belgium